The Bedford Public Library in Bedford, Iowa, was built in 1916.  It was designed by Wetherell & Gage with Colonial Revival and Renaissance Revival features.  The Carnegie Corporation of New York had accepted Bedford's application for a grant for $10,000 on April 8, 1907.  The library is a brick, side gable structure with a projecting entrance on the long side of the building. It was listed on the National Register of Historic Places in 1983.

References

Library buildings completed in 1916
Carnegie libraries in Iowa
Renaissance Revival architecture in Iowa
Colonial Revival architecture in Iowa
Buildings and structures in Taylor County, Iowa
Libraries on the National Register of Historic Places in Iowa
National Register of Historic Places in Taylor County, Iowa